Victor Grimmy Owusu (born July 20, 1987), better known by his stage name V.I.C., is a retired American rapper. His single, "Get Silly", reached #29 on the Billboard Hot 100 chart in 2008. He is also known for his hit single "Wobble".

Early life
V.I.C. was born Victor Grimmy Owusu in 1987 in Corona, Queens to a mother from New York City and a father from Ghana.  At ten he wrote his first song, a drug awareness rap for his elementary school. Later that year he moved with his family to the College Park. After graduating from high school, he worked as a freelance barber while pursuing a music career.

Music career
His first album Beast (2008) charted at number 73 on the Billboard 200. He recorded a couple of songs for a second album Revenge of the Beast that was never completed.

He released a single called "Twerk It" in 2012 and another called "Snapchat (Pose For The Camera)" in 2015. He briefly made a comeback in 2015, under the name "Genius," releasing the single "Murder She Wrote," before disappearing from the music industry and leaving his whereabouts unknown.

Discography

Albums

Mixtapes
2009: DJ J1 Present V.I.C. in HD
2009: DJ Jay Rock Presents V.I.C. Lord Ova Beats
2010: DJ Grady Presents V.I.C. Swagg Thru da Roof
2012: Big H & Tommy Boy Entertainment Presents V.I.C. Lord Ova Beats (hosted by DJ Grady, DJ J1 & DJ Iceberg)

Singles

References

External links
 Official MySpace

1987 births
Living people
African-American male rappers
African-American songwriters
American people of Ghanaian descent
People from College Park, Georgia
People from Queens, New York
Rappers from Georgia (U.S. state)
Rappers from New York City
Reprise Records artists
Songwriters from Georgia (U.S. state)
Songwriters from New York (state)
Southern hip hop musicians
Warner Records artists
21st-century American rappers
21st-century American male musicians
21st-century African-American musicians
20th-century African-American people
American male songwriters